Kazimierz may refer to:

People
 Casimir, English form of Polish Kazimierz, a given name (including a list of people with the name)
 Casimir III the Great / Kazimierz, king of Poland  1333 to 1370

Places
 Kazimierz, a district of Kraków, Poland.
 Kazimierz Dolny, in Puławy County, Lublin Voivodeship (eastern Poland)
 Kazimierz Landscape Park, a protected area around Kazimierz Dolny
 Kazimierz Biskupi, in Konin County, Greater Poland Voivodeship (west-central Poland)
 Kazimierz, Pabianice County in Łódź Voivodeship (central Poland)
 Kazimierz, Gmina Skomlin, in Wieluń County, Łódź Voivodeship (central Poland)
 Kazimierz, Opole Voivodeship (southwestern Poland)
 Kazimierz, Pomeranian Voivodeship (northern Poland)
 Kazimierz, West Pomeranian Voivodeship (northwestern Poland)

See also